François-Xavier Poizat is a pianist with French, Swiss and Chinese origins. He is the founder of the Puplinge Classique music festival.

References

1989 births
Living people
Classical pianists
21st-century classical pianists